The 2013 Rally Italia Sardegna was the seventh round of the 2013 World Rally Championship season. The event was based in Olbia, Gallura, and started on 21 June and was concluded on 23 June after twenty-three special stages, totaling 304.21 competitive kilometers.

Report 

Sébastien Ogier held the lead of the rally from start to finish; with three stage wins on the first day, Ogier held a lead of 46.6 seconds over Mikko Hirvonen, who battled for second with Thierry Neuville, with a difference of only 3.1 seconds at the end of the day. Both Qatar M-Sport World Rally Team drivers, Mads Østberg and Evgeny Novikov retired. On the second day, Hirvonen started with a stage win, but on the next stage went wide and got stuck into a ditch, leaving second place to Neuville. Ogier's teammate, Jari-Matti Latvala recovered from 12th position after a puncture on stage one, to finish third. Dani Sordo was the best Citroën finisher in fourth, ahead of Martin Prokop in fifth, while Elfyn Evans finished sixth on his début in a World Rally Car. Michał Kościuszko got his best result of the year in seventh, ahead of Østberg – recovering from his accident – to finish eighth via Rally-2. Robert Kubica got his first championship points by finishing ninth and Khalid Al Qassimi completed the top ten finishers.

Entry List 

Thirteen World Rally Cars were entered into the event, as were Thirteen WRC-2 entries and Ten WRC-3 entries.

Event Standing

References 

Sardegna
Rally Italia Sardegna
Rally Sardegna